Weena is a street with many highrises in the center of Rotterdam, Netherlands. It defines the Rotterdam skyline. The street of about 1 kilometer length leads east-west from Hofplein to Beukelsdijk.

History 
Weena was named after the Hof van Wena, a 12th-century keep which stood at the site of the former Hofplein Station. The building was destroyed in 1426. The name remained in use to designate the area just outside Hofpoort, the northern city gate.

In 1854 the names Weenastraat and Weenaplein were given to an existing street and square in the area, following city architect Willem Nicolaas Rose´s design. After the bombing of Rotterdam in 1940 the area was demolished.

In 1949 the city Government gave the name Weena to a street through the still wide open terrain. The construction of the Groothandelsgebouw (1953), Rotterdam Centraal Station (1957) and the Hilton Rotterdam (1963) transformed Weena into an icon of the postwar reconstruction of the city.  Major new developments followed in the 1990s and in the early 21st century.

In 2007 Weena was named the most air-polluted street in the Netherlands.

Places of interest 

 Rotterdam Centraal station is located on Stationsplein, the plaza which is accesible from Weena.
 Groothandelsgebouw, a National Monument on the corner of Weena and Stationsplein. One of the first major buildings to spur economic development after the German bombing of Rotterdam.
 Weenacenter, a 104-meter high residential tower built in 1992
 Milleniumtoren, a 131-meter high office tower with hotel.
 Delftse Poort, a twin-tower skyscraper that was the tallest building in the Netherlands between 1991 and 2005.
 Hilton Rotterdam on Weena 10, declared National Monument in 2016, by architect Hugh Maaskant
 Weenatunnel, an underground passage built in 1951
 Seated woman, Reclining figure and Standing figure, three sculptures by Willem de Kooning

References

Streets in Rotterdam